The Heritage at Millennium Park, located at 130 N. Garland Court in Chicago, Illinois is a mixed-use tower. It is the 36th-tallest building in Chicago. Like many newer buildings , the Heritage preserves and makes use of the façades of four existing buildings in its base.

The Heritage is located directly to the west of Millennium Park, with unobstructed views of Millennium Park, parts of Grant Park, and Lake Michigan.  It is directly opposite the Marshall Field and Company Building on Wabash Avenue. It has a private indoor pool, health club, dog run, party room, rooftop deck, and indoor parking. The tower is included in the extensive downtown underground pedway system. In addition to condominiums, the Heritage also contains ground floor retail space.

Trivia

It was said that Mayor Richard M. Daley was considering moving to the tower, but later decided to stay put in his South Loop residence as noted in an article in the Chicago Tribune in November 2005.

According to the 2000 census, 16,388 people live in the Loop. More recently , 60602 was named by Forbes as the hottest zip code in the country , with upscale buildings such as the Heritage at Millennium Park leading the way for other buildings such as Waterview Tower, The Legacy at Millennium Park and Momo. The median sale price for residential real estate was $710,000 in 2005 according to Forbes.  The average sale price at the Heritage in 2006 was $1.283 million according to data from the MLS and Rubloff.

The building bears a slight resemblance to One Rincon Hill in San Francisco  which was designed by the same architectural firm.

Position in skyline

See also
List of buildings
List of skyscrapers
List of tallest buildings in Chicago
List of tallest buildings in the United States
World's tallest structures

References

Inline

 Emporis listing - The Heritage at Millennium Park

External links
The Heritage at Millennium Park Condominium Sales & Rental Website
Condominium Association website

Residential condominiums in Chicago
Residential skyscrapers in Chicago
Residential buildings completed in 2005
2005 establishments in Illinois